Hybla may refer to:



Places

Sicily
Hybla Gereatis or Hybla Galeatis, possibly modern Paternò
Hybla Heraea, historic quarter (Ibla) of modern Ragusa
Hybla Major, perhaps identical with Megara Hyblaea or with Hybla Gereatis
Hybla Minor, a Sicel site on the east coast north of Syracuse
Megara Hyblaea, archeological site near Augusta

North America 
Hybla, Ontario, Canada
Hybla Valley, Virginia, U.S.

Other 
 Hybla (leafhopper), an insect genus in the tribe Dikraneurini
TCP Hybla, a congestion avoidance algorithm for TCP

See also
Hyblaean Mountains, south-eastern Sicily, Italy
Hyblaeidae, a family of moths